The puna yellow finch (Sicalis lutea) is a species of bird in the family Thraupidae.
It is found in Argentina, Bolivia, and Peru.
Its natural habitat is subtropical or tropical high-altitude grassland.

References

puna yellow finch
Birds of the Puna grassland
puna yellow finch
Taxonomy articles created by Polbot